Paul Desmond (born Paul Emil Breitenfeld; November 25, 1924 – May 30, 1977) was an American jazz alto saxophonist and composer and proponent of cool jazz. He was a member of the Dave Brubeck Quartet and composed that group's biggest hit, "Take Five".

In addition to his work with Brubeck, he led several groups and collaborated with Gerry Mulligan, Chet Baker, Jim Hall, and Ed Bickert. After years of chain smoking and poor health, Desmond succumbed to lung cancer in 1977 after a tour with Brubeck.

Early life
Desmond was born Paul Emil Breitenfeld in San Francisco, California, in 1924, the son of Shirley (née King) and Emil Aron Breitenfeld. His grandfather Sigmund Breitenfeld, a medical doctor, was born in Austria in 1857; he and wife Hermine (née Lewy) emigrated to the US at the end of the 19th century. They had four children (including Emil, father of Paul Emil). Paul Desmond and members of his father's family "frequently speculated as to whether or not Sigmund or Hermine Breitenfeld had Jewish backgrounds", but they did not identify as Jewish, or observe Jewish traditions. However, Fred Barton, songwriter/arranger and Desmond's cousin, found extensive genealogical proof that both the Breitenfeld and Löwy families were Bohemian Jews. The Breitenfeld family in Bohemia and Vienna featured musicians in every generation throughout the 1800s, 1900s, and to the present day. Desmond's mother, born Shirley King, was of an Irish Catholic family.

Desmond's father Emil Breitenfeld was a pianist, organist, arranger, and composer who accompanied silent films in movie theaters and produced musical arrangements for printed publication and for live theatrical productions. During World War I, while training with the 17th New York Regiment in Plattsburgh, New York, he composed The Last Long Mile, one of the best-known soldiers' songs of that war.

Desmond's mother Shirley was emotionally unstable throughout his upbringing, and appears to have suffered from obsessive–compulsive disorder and other mental illnesses. Starting in 1933, Desmond spent nearly five years living with relatives in New Rochelle, New York due to his mother's mental health problems.

Desmond began to study the  clarinet at the age of twelve, which he continued while at San Francisco Polytechnic High School. While in high school, Desmond wished to study the violin, but his father dissuaded him, saying that violin players were "a dime a dozen....with the violin, you'll starve." Desmond developed a talent for writing during high school as well, becoming co-editor of his high school newspaper. In that capacity, he interviewed comedian Bob Hope for his school newspaper during one of Hope's visits to San Francisco. After high school, Desmond enrolled at San Francisco State College where he majored in English. At that time, he began playing the alto saxophone, after being influenced by the likes of Lester Young and Charlie Parker. In his first year of college, Desmond was drafted into the United States Army and joined the Army band while stationed in San Francisco. He spent three years in the military, but his unit was not called to combat.

Following his military discharge, Paul Emil Breitenfeld legally changed his last name from Breitenfeld to Desmond in 1946. He told many stories over the years regarding how he chose the name Desmond, but his biographer Doug Ramsey offers an account from Desmond's friend Hal Strack that the two were listening to the Glenn Miller band singer Johnny Desmond in 1942, and Desmond told Strack "that's such a great name. It's so smooth and yet it's uncommon....If I ever decide I need another name, it's going to be Desmond."

Desmond was married from 1947 to 1949 to Duane Reeves Lamon. He never remarried.

Career
After World War II, Desmond started working in the San Francisco Bay Area, working as a backing musician. He worked occasionally for Dave Brubeck at the Geary Cellar in San Francisco. For several weeks, he led a small jazz combo at the Band Box in Redwood City that included Dave Brubeck. Desmond had a falling out with Brubeck when he resigned from the Band Box and prevented Brubeck from taking over the residency. In 1950 Desmond joined the band of Jack Fina and toured with Fina for several months, but he returned to California after hearing Brubeck's trio on the radio and deciding that he should repair his relationship with Brubeck and attempt to join Brubeck's increasingly successful band.

At the time, Brubeck and wife Iola had three small children, and Brubeck had instructed Iola not to let Desmond set foot in the family home. Desmond appeared at Brubeck's San Francisco apartment one day while Dave was in the back yard hanging diapers on a laundry line, and Iola, defying Brubeck's wishes, let Desmond in and took him to Dave. Desmond offered to perform arranging and administrative work for Brubeck's band, and to babysit Brubeck's children, and Brubeck finally relented and agreed to try working with Desmond again.

Dave Brubeck Quartet

Desmond met Dave Brubeck in 1944 in the military. Brubeck was trying out for the 253rd Army band, which Desmond belonged to. After making the cut he—unlike Desmond—was sent overseas in 1944, to Europe. Desmond once told Marian McPartland of National Public Radio's Piano Jazz that he was taken aback by the chord changes which Brubeck introduced during that 1944 audition. After Desmond convinced Brubeck to hire him following his stint with Jack Fina, the two had a contract drafted (of which Brubeck was the sole signatory); the language forbade Brubeck from firing him, ensured Brubeck's status as group leader, and gave Desmond twenty percent of all profits generated from the quartet. That is how the Dave Brubeck Quartet had its start, a group that began in 1951 and ended in December 1967.

The quartet became especially popular with college-age audiences, often performing in college settings, including their ground-breaking 1953 album Jazz at Oberlin at Oberlin College and at the campuses of Ohio University and the University of Michigan. The success of the quartet led to a Time magazine piece on them in 1954, with the famous cover featuring Brubeck's face.

After drummer Joe Dodge decided to leave the group, Joe Morello joined in late 1956 with Desmond's recommendation. Yet with different musical aspiration and taste, their relationship was full of tension. Desmond hoped for a  "tinky-boom" background-type drummer while Morello wanted to be recognized and featured. During Morello's first performance with the group, he was featured by Brubeck and received an ovation from the audience for his solo. Desmond resented this, and threatened to leave the group. Brubeck managed to keep both Desmond and Morello in the group but with frictions between them for years. Desmond's grudge against Morello could also be heard during their performance. In their 'Take The ‘A’ Train' performance in Hanover, Germany in 1958, for example, Desmond's playing sounded lack-luster and uninterested. After Morello's complex rhythm, Desmond would play even quieter and even dropped for a few bars. In their later years they reconciled and became close friends.

The Dave Brubeck Quartet played until 1967, when Brubeck switched his musical focus from performance to composition and dissolved the group. During the 1970s Desmond joined Brubeck for several reunion tours, including "Two Generations of Brubeck". Accompanying them were Brubeck's sons Chris Brubeck, Dan Brubeck and Darius Brubeck. In 1976 Desmond played 25 shows in 25 nights with Brubeck, touring the United States by bus.

Other collaborations

Desmond worked several times during his career with baritone saxophonist and band leader Gerry Mulligan. They made two studio albums together (Gerry Mulligan - Paul Desmond Quartet (1957), and Two of a Mind (1962)). In June 1969 Desmond appeared at the New Orleans Jazz Festival with Gerry Mulligan, with favorable reactions from critics and audience members. During Brubeck's Two Generations tours, Desmond and Mulligan shared the stage in 1974. Unlike Brubeck, Mulligan shared much in common with Desmond, such as similar interests and humor, and both men had no shortage of addictions in their lives.

Desmond had a celebrated studio partnership with guitarist Jim Hall. Hall played on several albums recorded by Desmond between 1959 and 1963 for Warner Bros. and RCA Victor. After some time spent inactive, Desmond was asked to play the Half Note in New York City in 1971 by Hall. With his special brand of humor, Desmond said that he took the job only because he was nearby and could tumble out of bed to work. The two continued to play at the club to jam-packed audiences. Desmond also joined the Modern Jazz Quartet for a Christmas concert in 1971 at the New York Town Hall.

Desmond was a guest artist on five tracks by Chet Baker recorded between 1975 and 1977. These were released on the albums She Was Too Good to Me, You Can't Go Home Again, and The Best Thing For You. Baker and Desmond also appeared together on two tracks included on Jim Hall's 1975 Concierto album.

Desmond met Canadian guitarist Ed Bickert through a recommendation by Jim Hall, and Desmond performed with Bickert at several clubs in the Toronto area during 1974–1975. Desmond featured Bickert on his 1975 studio album Pure Desmond, and the two played together at the 1976 Edmonton Jazz Festival. Live recordings of that concert and club dates with Bickert performed during 1974-1975 were released during and after Desmond's lifetime.

Personal life
In their private lives Dave Brubeck and his family were very close to Paul Desmond, though the two men possessed very different personalities. Darius Brubeck recalls thinking that Desmond was his uncle almost into adolescence. Desmond grew especially close to Dave's son Michael, to whom he left his saxophone upon his death. Desmond was also described as a womanizer who was unable to form (and was uninterested in maintaining) steady relationships with women, though he had no shortage of female companions throughout his life. Desmond is reported to have quipped, upon seeing a former girlfriend on the street, "There she goes, not with a whim but a banker" (a semi-Spoonerism reference to T.S. Eliot's "This is the way the world ends / Not with a bang but a whimper"). In contrast, Brubeck was deeply religious and a stalwart family man.
Desmond enjoyed reading works by the thinkers of his generation like Timothy Leary and Jack Kerouac, also dabbling in some LSD usage. He was known to have several addictions, including Dewar's Scotch whisky and Pall Mall cigarettes. In the 1940s and 1950s, Desmond frequently took amphetamines, and in the 1970s, he was known to use cocaine. His chemical-dependency problems would sometimes drain him of his energy on the road. Clarinetist Perry Robinson recalls in his autobiography that Desmond would sometimes need a vitamin B12 shot just to go on playing during his later career.
Desmond died on May 30, 1977, not of his heavy alcohol habit but of lung cancer, the result of his longtime heavy smoking. Never without his humor, after he was diagnosed with cancer he expressed pleasure at the health of his liver. His last concert was with Brubeck in February 1977, in New York City. His fans were unaware of his rapidly declining health. Desmond specified in his will that all proceeds from "Take Five" would go to the Red Cross following his death. Desmond reportedly owned a Baldwin grand piano, which he lent to Bradley Cunningham, owner of Bradley's piano bar in Greenwich Village, provided that Cunningham move the large piano back to Desmond's Upper West Side apartment to become part of Desmond's estate. After this long and expensive process, Desmond willed the piano to Cunningham, a characteristic and final prank. The Paul Desmond Papers are held at the Holt-Atherton Special Collections in the University of the Pacific Library.

Desmond was cremated and his ashes were scattered.

Style
Desmond produced a light, melodic tone on the alto saxophone, trying to sound, he said, "like a dry martini." With a style that was similar to that of Lee Konitz, one of his influences, he quickly became one of the best-known saxophonists from the West Coast's cool school of jazz. Much of the success of the classic Brubeck quartet was due to the juxtaposition of his airy style over Brubeck's sometimes relatively heavy, polytonal piano work.

Desmond's improvisation is praised for its logical structure and lyricism. His gift for improvised counterpoint is perhaps most evident on his two albums with baritone saxophonist Gerry Mulligan (Mulligan-Desmond Quartet and Two of a Mind). In his playing Desmond was also notable for his ability to produce extremely high notes, the altissimo register, on his saxophone.

Desmond played a Selmer Super Balanced Action model alto saxophone with an M. C. Gregory model 4A-18M hard rubber mouthpiece, both dating from circa 1951, with a moderately stiff Rico 3 ½ reed.

Discography

With Dave Brubeck

As bandleader

With Gerry Mulligan

With Chet Baker

Other

References

1924 births
1977 deaths
American people of Czech-Jewish descent
American people of Irish descent
American jazz alto saxophonists
American male saxophonists
United States Army personnel of World War II
Cool jazz saxophonists
Mainstream jazz saxophonists
Composers from San Francisco
West Coast jazz saxophonists
RCA Victor artists
United States Army soldiers
Jazz musicians from San Francisco
Jazz alto saxophonists
20th-century American composers
20th-century American saxophonists
Deaths from lung cancer in New York (state)
United States Army Band musicians
Bebop saxophonists
San Francisco State University alumni
American male jazz composers
American jazz composers
20th-century American male musicians
Dave Brubeck Quartet members
20th-century jazz composers
CTI Records artists